Greetingman is a modern sculpture project in South Korea.

Its main artist is Yoo Young-ho (South Korean sculptor). The concept provides a man, 6 meters high, bowing in a typically Asian greeting gesture. The blue color means lack of prejudice.

In October 2012, a statue was unveiled in the neighbourhood of Buceo, Montevideo, Uruguay, with South Korea being the antipode of Uruguay, the statues represent two men greeting each other from opposites sides of the world, however, this was the first of a planned world series in multiple locations.

The second statue was unveiled in October 2013 in South Korea, near the Korean Demilitarized Zone, in Haean, Yanggu County, Gangwon.

A third statue was unveiled in January 2016 in Panama City, Panama, the second to be unveiled in Latin America.

Another statue was built in Merida, Yucatan, Mexico on March 17, 2021. It commemorates the large Korean community that was started by the first wave in 1905 of henequen laborers.

See also
Korean sculpture
Public art in South Korea

References

Outdoor sculptures in South Korea
Arts in South Korea
Buceo
South Korea–Uruguay relations
Korean Demilitarized Zone
Panama–South Korea relations